Malcolm McLane (October 3, 1924 – February 2, 2008) was an American businessman, politician, and lawyer.

Born in Manchester, New Hampshire, McLane served as a pilot in the United States Army Air Forces during World War II. He spent the last months of World War II in a German prisoner of war camp after his plane was shot down during the Battle of the Bulge in December 1944. He graduated from Dartmouth College and Harvard Law School. McLane was a Rhodes Scholar. He then practiced law in Concord, New Hampshire. He helped start the Wildcat Mountain Ski Area in Pinkham Notch, New Hampshire. McLane served on the Concord City Council. In 1972, McLane ran for Governor of New Hampshire as an Independent. Then, from 1970 to 1976, McLane served as mayor of Concord. McLane served on the New Hampshire Executive Council from 1977 to 1982. John McLane, Governor of New Hampshire, was his grandfather. His wife Susan McLane served in the New Hampshire General Court, and their daughter Ann McLane Kuster is the current representative from New Hampshire's 2nd congressional district. McLane died at his home in Hanover, New Hampshire.

Notes

1924 births
2008 deaths
Politicians from Manchester, New Hampshire
Military personnel from New Hampshire
United States Army Air Forces pilots of World War II
American Rhodes Scholars
Dartmouth College alumni
Harvard Law School alumni
Businesspeople from New Hampshire
New Hampshire lawyers
New Hampshire Independents
Members of the Executive Council of New Hampshire
New Hampshire city council members
Mayors of Concord, New Hampshire
McLane family of New Hampshire
20th-century American politicians
20th-century American businesspeople
20th-century American lawyers
American prisoners of war in World War II
World War II prisoners of war held by Germany
Shot-down aviators